Round Mountain is a small  summit made of gray hornblende plagioclase trachyte in the Castle Valley in southeastern Grand County, Utah, United States, about  east-northeast of Moab. Precipitation runoff from the mountain drains into Castle Creek, which is a tributary of the Colorado River. The nearest higher peak is Castleton Tower,  to the southwest.

See also

 List of mountains in Utah

References

External links

Mountains of Utah
Mountains of Grand County, Utah
North American 1000 m summits